The AUF Sports and Cultural Center (AUF–SCC), also known as the AUF Gymnasium, is an indoor arena in Angeles, Philippines. Owned by the Angeles University Foundation, the venue has served various regional and international sports competitions.

History
The AUF Sports and Cultural Center was built in 2012 for the Angeles University Foundation (AUF). Jose Siao Ling and Associates is the architecture firm responsible for its design. The construction of the facility was done under then-Acting AUF President Joseph Emmanuel Angeles. The venue inaugurated on May 24, 2012, eventually become a major venue for sports, cultural and social events in Central Luzon.

It was also one of the venues of the 2019 Southeast Asian Games which was hosted by the Philippines. It specifically hosted events in arnis, sambo, and wrestling.

The AUF Gymnasium during the COVID-19 pandemic hosted various tournaments under a bio-secure bubble set-up; this include the 2020 PBA Philippine Cup, and select groups of the 2021 FIBA Asia Cup qualifiers.

Facilities
The AUF Sports and Cultural Center's basketball court is situated on the fourth floor.

Tenants
The AUF Sports and Cultural Center hosts the Angeles University Foundation's varsity team, the Great Danes. The Pampanga Giant Lanterns of the Maharlika Pilipinas Basketball League also used the venue for their home games. The Philippine Basketball Association has occasionally used the AUF gymnasium for their "out-of-town" games prior to hosting a bubble tournament there in 2020.

Events

2019 Southeast Asian Games (Arnis, Sambo, Wrestling)
2020 PBA Philippine Cup (Clark Bubble)
2021 FIBA Asia Cup qualification

References

Buildings and structures in Angeles City
Basketball venues in the Philippines
Indoor arenas in the Philippines
University sports venues in the Philippines
Sports venues completed in 2012